Winter Journey is a 2006 German drama film directed by Hans Steinbichler.

Cast 
 Josef Bierbichler as Franz Brenninger
 Sibel Kekilli as Leyla
 Hanna Schygulla as Martha "Mucky" Brenninger
 Philipp Hochmair as Xaver Brenninger
 Anna Schudt as Paula Brenninger
  as Holger 'Sparkasse' Mankewski
 André Hennicke as Friedländer
  as Jacqueline
  as Tom Kanabe
  as Notar
  as Arzt
  as Botschafter
 Martin Goeres as

References

External links 

2006 drama films
2006 films
German drama films
2000s German-language films
2000s German films
Films directed by Hans Steinbichler